David Vivian Currie,  (July 8, 1912 – June 20, 1986) was a Canadian recipient of the Victoria Cross, the highest award for gallantry in the face of the enemy that can be awarded to British and Commonwealth forces.

Early life

Currie was born in Sutherland, Saskatchewan, the only son and eldest child of David Henry Currie and his wife Mable Brimble. The elder Currie worked as an engineer for the Canadian Pacific Railroad. From 1913 to 1939 the family lived in Moose Jaw, Saskatchewan. D.V. Currie was educated at King George Public School, the Central Collegiate and Moose Jaw Technical School. He was trained as an automobile mechanic and welder.

Military service
In 1939 he joined the militia, before joining the Regular Army the following year. He was commissioned as a lieutenant shortly afterwards, before being promoted to captain in 1941. By 1944 he had reached the rank of major.

Currie was awarded the Victoria Cross for his actions in command of a battle group of tanks from The South Alberta Regiment, artillery, and infantry of the Argyll and Sutherland Highlanders of Canada at St. Lambert-sur-Dives in France, during the final actions to close the Falaise Gap. This was the only Victoria Cross awarded to a Canadian soldier during the Normandy campaign (6 June 1944 through to the end of August 1944), and the only VC ever awarded to a member of the Royal Canadian Armoured Corps.

The then 32 year-old Currie was a Major in The South Alberta Regiment, Canadian Army during the Second World War. During the Battle of Falaise, Normandy, between 18–20 August 1944, Currie was in command of a small mixed force of tanks, self-propelled anti-tank guns, and infantry which had been ordered to cut off one of the Germans' main escape routes.

After Currie led the attack on the village of St. Lambert-sur-Dives and consolidated a position halfway inside it, his force repulsed repeated enemy attacks over the next day and a half. Despite heavy casualties, Major Currie's small force destroyed seven enemy tanks, twelve 88 mm guns, and 40 vehicles, which led to the deaths of 300 German soldiers, 500 wounded, and 2,100 captured. The remnants of two German armies were denied an escape route.

Currie later achieved the rank of lieutenant colonel. After his military career, he served as Sergeant at Arms in the House of Commons of Canada from 1960 to 1978. In this role, he also served as a production consultant on the politically-themed CBC Television drama series Quentin Durgens, M.P..

He died in 1986 and was buried at Greenwood Cemetery, Owen Sound, Ontario. The armoury in Moose Jaw, Saskatchewan has since been named the "Lt. Colonel D.V. Currie Armoury" in his honour. Currie Avenue in the Montgomery Place neighborhood of Saskatoon was named in his honor.

Medals
In August 2017, Currie's VC and other medals were presented for auction by the British company of Dix Noonan Webb.  The seller had purchased them from Currie's widow in 1989, and they were being held by Canadian dealer Tanya Ursual. The sale price was £550,000 or slightly more than $916,000 Canadian dollars. Of the 16 Victoria Crosses awarded to Canadians in the Second World War, 12 were awarded to men serving in Canadian units. On May 1, 2018, the Canadian War Museum announced that it had acquired LCol. Currie's medals through a concerted effort of the Department of Canadian Heritage, as well as several honorary members of the North Saskatchewan Regiment.

Citation
The following is the citation for Currie's Victoria Cross.

References

External links
 

Canadian World War II recipients of the Victoria Cross
1912 births
1986 deaths
People from Saskatoon
Canadian Army officers
Sergeants-at-Arms of the Canadian House of Commons
Canadian Army personnel of World War II
Canadian Battle of Normandy recipients of the Victoria Cross
Canadian military personnel from Saskatchewan
South Alberta Light Horse
South Alberta Regiment officers
Burials in Ontario